Service for Ladies (released as Reserved for Ladies in the U.S.) is a 1932 British comedy film, the second based on the novel The Head Waiter by Ernest Vajda. The film was directed by Alexander Korda and starred Leslie Howard.

A previous 1927 silent film which starred Adolphe Menjou is now lost.

Plot 
Max Tracey is the highly respected head waiter at London's Grand Palace Hotel. He falls in love at first sight with Sylvia Robertson, a young woman staying at the hotel, even though he is carrying on an affair with Countess Ricardi. He impulsively joins Sylvia and her father when they leave for the Continent, much to her delight.

Max encounters a monarch traveling incognito as "Mr. Westlake", though all the guests at the hotel where Max and Sylvia are presently staying know who he is. The king knows Max and greets him warmly in the dining room in front of everyone. From this, everyone surmises that Max is a prince, also incognito. Max is pleased when Sylvia states that "social differences" do not matter to her, but before he can reveal his true identity, her father returns.

Complications arise when Countess Ricardi shows up, having seen a newspaper photograph of Max and the king. The countess suspects that Max has fallen for another woman. Sylvia seems them together and her ardour cools, but her father persuades her to fight her rival for Max. Sylvia makes the acquaintance of Countess Ricardi, and Max ends up awkwardly dining with both women, Mr. Robertson and the king at the same table. Max decides to give Sylvia up. She goes to his room to try to make him change his mind, but though he is tempted, he tells her it is impossible. He returns to London. Mr. Robertson is furious and asks the king who Max is and where he can find him; the king tells him to come to dine with him at the Grand Palace Hotel for the answers.

Max is forced to serve the king and the Robertsons in the restaurant. Sylvia makes it painfully clear she does not associate with the lower classes. Then she insists that Max manage a private dinner party for her, even though that is the duty of another waiter. At the party, Sylvia behaves very spitefully towards Max, but Mr. Robinson is a different story. He confides to Max that he started out as a dishwasher, but he knew what he wanted and went after it. Then he encourages Max to do the same. Max reminds Sylvia he promised to kiss her. To avoid him doing so before her guests, she goes into another room. His kiss makes her change her mind, and they elope, leaving the guests waiting.

Cast

Reception
Service for Ladies was voted the second best British film of 1932.

References

External links 
 
 
 

1932 films
1932 romantic comedy films
British black-and-white films
British remakes of American films
British romantic comedy films
Films based on Hungarian novels
Films directed by Alexander Korda
Films produced by Alexander Korda
Films set in hotels
Films set in London
Films set in restaurants
British multilingual films
Sound film remakes of silent films
1932 multilingual films
Films scored by Percival Mackey
Films shot at Imperial Studios, Elstree
1930s English-language films
1930s British films